Christina Elisabeth Östberg (born 10 May 1968) is a Swedish politician and a member of the Riksdag for the Sweden Democrats party. She was first elected in 2014 and has served on the Social Affairs Committee and Education Committee in parliament.  In parliament, Östberg has called for tougher laws against substance and drug abuse.

References 

Living people
1968 births
Members of the Riksdag 2014–2018
Members of the Riksdag 2018–2022
Members of the Riksdag from the Sweden Democrats
21st-century Swedish politicians